Room 101 refers to a torture chamber in the Ministry of Love in George Orwell's novel Nineteen Eighty-Four. 

Room 101 may also refer to:

Room 101 (radio series) (1992–1994), BBC Radio 5 programme
Room 101 (British TV series), BBC Two (1994–2007) and BBC One (2012–2018) programme 
Room 101 (Australian TV series) (2015), SBS One comedy show
 Room 101 (brand), a brand of cigars produced by Camacho Cigars
 Room 101 (alias), an alias used by vexatious gamer group Patriotic Nigras in Second Life
 Room 101 (1982 mixtape) by The Faction
 Room 101 (1984 song) by the Eurythmics from the album 1984 (For the Love of Big Brother)
 Room 101 (2000 song) from the album Drama (Jamelia album)
 Room 101 (2002 song) from the album Funk (album)
 Room 101 (2017 song) by Tich
 Room 101 (2021 album) by Karmamoi

See also

 101 (disambiguation)